Crescentius the Younger (or Crescentius II; died 29 April 998), son of Crescentius the Elder, was a leader of the aristocracy of medieval Rome. During the minority of Holy Roman Emperor Otto III, he declared himself Consul (or Senator) of Rome (Patricius Romanorum) and made himself de facto ruler of Rome. After being deposed, he led a rebellion, seized control of Rome, and appointed an antipope, but the rebellion failed and Crescentius was eventually executed.

Control of Rome
The aspirations of the Roman aristocracy did not vanish with the death of the older Crescentius. The latter left a son, also called Crescentius, who after the death of Boniface VII took the reins of power in his hands. Circumstances seemed to be particularly favourable. The Emperor Otto III (985–96) was still a child, and the empress mother, Theophanu, although an energetic princess, was absent from Rome. Crescentius the Younger took the title of Patricius Romanorum, by which he meant to express that he was ruler in Rome, though not altogether independent of the imperial authority; he considered himself as a lieutenant of the Holy Roman Emperor. It is quite likely that the election of Pope John XV (985–996), who succeeded Boniface VII, was accomplished with the participation of Crescentius, although the particulars of that election are unknown. In some of the official documents of the time, issued by the pope, the name of Crescentius and his title of Patricius appear together with the name of John XV; and for a number of years Crescentius exercised his authority apparently without opposition. When the Empress Theophanu came to Rome in 989, she conducted herself as empress and sovereign, while leaving Crescentius his subordinate position.

Fall from power
Meanwhile, the young Emperor Otto III assumed the reins of government, and in 996 made his first journey to Italy, induced by various considerations, especially by the appeals of Pope John XV. However, death overtook the pope at the beginning of April, 996, before Otto reached Rome. The Romans and their leader, Crescentius, did not care at this time to nominate a successor to the deceased pope. They sent a delegation to the emperor with the request that he provide a suitable candidate for the Holy See. Otto III was at Ravenna when the delegates from Rome arrived. After a consultation with his counsellors he chose his own cousin, Bruno, a young ecclesiastic, only twenty-three years of age, who seemed to have the necessary qualifications. Early in May he was consecrated at Rome as Gregory V, being the first pope of German nationality. A few weeks afterwards Otto III himself was crowned in Rome by the new pope (21 May) in St. Peter's Basilica.

On 25 May the pope and the emperor held in St. Peter's a synod, which was at the same time a high court of justice. The rebellious Romans, including Crescentius, who had embittered the last years of the pontificate of Pope John XV, were summoned to give an account of their doings. The result was that a certain number, among them Crescentius, were sentenced to banishment. Pope Gregory V, who wished to inaugurate his pontificate with acts of mercy, pleaded for the guilty, and the emperor withdrew his sentence of exile. Crescentius was deprived of his title of Patricius, but was permitted to live in retirement at Rome.

Rebellion
The clemency shown to Crescentius by the pope was repaid with deeds of violence. Only a few months after the departure of the emperor for Germany a revolt broke out in Rome under the leadership of Crescentius. The foreign pope and the many foreign officers installed throughout the Papal States were offensive in the sight of the Romans. In September, 996, the pope was forced to flee with only a few attendants. At Pavia he held a synod in February, 996, in which he pronounced sentence of excommunication against Crescentius, the usurper and invader of the Church of Rome. Crescentius, far from being moved by these proceedings against him, completed his work of rebellion by appointing an antipope, Johannes Philagathos, Bishop of Piacenza, who had just returned from an embassy to Constantinople on behalf of Emperor Otto III. In April 997, he assumed the title of Pope John XVI.

In February 998, Otto III returned to Rome with Pope Gregory V and took possession of the city without much difficulty. The antipope sought safety in flight, while Crescentius shut himself up in Castel Sant'Angelo in Rome. John XVI was soon captured by the emissaries of the emperor; his nose and ears were cut off, his eyes and tongue were torn out, and in this pitiable condition he was made to ride backwards on an ass. At the intercession of Saint Nilus the Younger, one of his countrymen, his life was spared: he was sent to the monastery of Fulda, in Germany, where he died about 1001. Towards the end of April Castel Sant'Angelo was taken; Crescentius was made prisoner and executed and his corpse hung on a gibbet erected on Monte Mario. Afterwards his remains were interred in the church of S. Pancrazio on the Janiculum.

References

External links
 A poem by Letitia Elizabeth Landon in the Literary Gazette, 1823.

 A poem by Felicia Hemans, in Tales and Historic Scenes, 1819.

10th-century births
998 deaths
People of medieval Rome
10th-century Italian nobility
Executed Italian people
People excommunicated by the Catholic Church
Medieval Roman consuls
People executed in the Holy Roman Empire by decapitation
10th-century executions
Medieval Roman patricians